St Levan's Church, Porthpean is a Grade II listed parish church in the Church of England in Higher Porthpean, Cornwall.

History

The church was built between 1884 and 1885 by James Arthur Reeve, funded by Sir Charles Brune Graves-Sawle, 2nd Baronet. It was consecrated on 22 October 1885 by the Bishop of Truro, George Wilkinson.

Parish status

The church is in a joint parish with
Holy Trinity Church, St Austell
All Saints’ Church, Pentewan

Organ

The organ was built by Hele & Co in 1927. A specification of the organ can be found on the National Pipe Organ Register.

References

Porthpean
Porthpean
Churches completed in 1885